Steynton or Stainton is a parish in the county of Pembrokeshire, Wales, formerly in the hundred of Rhôs and now an area of Milford Haven and in the Community of Tiers Cross. The parish includes the hamlet of Dreenhill, near Haverfordwest. The parish population is about 3,000.

Geography
Steynton has a crossroads from which roads lead to Milford Haven to the south, and from it toward Johnston and Haverfordwest in the north and Jordanston and Pembroke, Pembroke Dock and Neyland to the east. The road to the west leads to the hamlet of Thornton. The parish includes the hamlet of Dreenhill, near Haverfordwest, as well as other settlements.

Steynton has a pub, the Horse and Jockey.

Dreenhill
Dreenhill has a Calvanistic Methodist Chapel, established in 1834. The hamlet has a garage, The Masons pub and restaurant (formerly the Masons Arms) and a few houses, and is surrounded by farmland.

History
The toponym is likely derived from the Old English tun, meaning settlement or manor.

Steynton was once a medieval parish and village, with a parish church dedicated to Saints Cewydd and Peter. The oldest parts of the present church may be 14th or 15th century. The church tower was used as a musketry position in the English Civil War action at Pill Fort in Milford Haven. The church is directly in line with St Katherine's church to the south and Johnston church to the north. The ancient parish extended almost as far as Haverfordwest to the north.

Steynton is part of the local government community of Miford Haven.

References

External links

Milford Haven
Villages in Pembrokeshire